Bornhöved is a municipality in the Kreis (district) of Segeberg in Schleswig-Holstein, north Germany. It is situated some 16 km east of Neumünster.

Bornhöved is part of the Amt (municipal confederation) of Bornhöved.

References

Segeberg